Benjamin Graham Beevers (born ) is a former professional rugby league footballer who played in the 1980s.

Playing career

Challenge Cup Final appearances
Ben Beevers played left-, i.e. number 8, (replaced by interchange/substitute Neil James) in Halifax's 19-18 victory over St. Helens in the 1987 Challenge Cup Final during the 1986–87 season at Wembley Stadium, London on Saturday 2 May 1987.

Championship appearances
Ben was at Halifax for ten years which included 10 appearances (2 as a substitute) in Halifax's victory in the  Championship during the 1985–86 season.

One-club man
Ben Beevers was a fantastic asset for Halifax. He did not score many tries but he was a whole-hearted prop forward who gave his all for the team. He was awarded a testimonial by the club in 1990. Ben recalls that one of his best moments was holding the Challenge Cup triumphant after the 1987 Challenge Cup final.

References

External links

Living people
English rugby league players
Halifax R.L.F.C. players
Place of birth missing (living people)
Rugby league props
Rugby league players from Halifax, West Yorkshire
Rugby league second-rows
Year of birth missing (living people)